Abertamy is a town in Karlovy Vary District in the Karlovy Vary Region of the Czech Republic. It has about 900 inhabitants. The town is known as a winter sports centre.

Administrative parts
The village of Hřebečná is the administrative part of Abertamy.

Geography
It lies in the Ore Mountains.

History

Miners started to settle in the area between 1525 and 1529. The first written mention of Abertamy is from 1529. In 1579, Abertamy was promoted to royal mining town by Emperor Rudolf II. On 15 September 1590, a strong earthquake was recorded here. Silver mining gradually declined, especially during the Thirty Years' War, when it ended in 1622. Only the mining of tin continued. Abertamy lost its town rights, and the area was forcibly recatholicized after the war. In the mid-19th century manufacturing of gloves began and expanded in the 20th century. In 1876 Abertamy obtained the town status again.

In the 1930s, 98% of the population of Abertamy were ethnic Germans. The town was annexed by Nazi Germany in 1938 and in 1938–1945 it was one of the municipalities in Sudetenland. In 1945 many German speaking people were expelled and local industry was nationalised. However roughly 150,000 of three million Sudeten Germans in the surrounding region were not expelled due to their indispensable mining and technical skills. A large German-speaking minority remained here until the 2000s, but it is gradually disappearing.

Intensive mining of uranium ore had started in the area after the World War II. There used to be two shafts in Abertamy. In 1998 the factory producing gloves closed down.

Demographics

Sport
The area is actively used for winter and summer sports. There is a large modern ski resort on the slopes of the mountain Plešivec. It has eight downhill courses and nine ski lifts.

Sights

The most valuable monument in Abertamy is Mauritius Mine, which is remains of the largest tin mine in the Ore Mountains. It was in operation from the 16th century to the 1940s. Today it is a national cultural monument and, since 2019, it has been a UNESCO World Heritage Site as a part of the Ore Mountain Mining Region. It is open to the public. Červená jáma, which is the largest depression after mining activities in the country, is also a part of the protected area of the mine.

The Church of Fourteen Holy Helpers was built in the late Gothic style in 1534. In 1735–1738, it was baroque rebuilt. It was modified to its present form in the first half of the 19th century.

Notable people
Horst Siegl (born 1969), footballer

Gallery

References

External links

Official website 

Cities and towns in the Czech Republic
Populated places in Karlovy Vary District
Towns in the Ore Mountains